Henri-René Lenormand (3 May 1882 - 16 February 1951) was a French playwright. He was born on 3 May 1882 in Paris. His plays, steeped in symbolism, were recognized for their explorations of subconscious motivation, deeply reflecting the influence of the theories of Sigmund Freud. He was the son of a composer, René Lenormand, and was educated at the University of Paris. When Lenormand died on 16 February 1951 in Paris, he was survived by his wife, Dutch actress Marie Kalff.

Bibliography
Le Cachet Rouge (1900)
La Grande Mort (1905)
Au Désert (1905)
Le Réveil de l'instinct (1908)
Les Possédés (1909)
Terres Chaudes (1913)
Les Ratés (1920)
Les Mangeurs de Rêves (1922)
Mixture (1927)
La Folle du Ciel (1936)
Les Pitoëff, souvenirs (1943)
Confessions d'un auter dramatique (1949)
Marguerite Jamois (1950)

Notes

External links
Lenormand on the Columbia Encyclopedia

 Finding aid to the H.R. Lenormand papers at Columbia University. Rare Book & Manuscript Library.

20th-century French dramatists and playwrights
1882 births
1951 deaths